The 2004 European Speed Skating Championships were held at Thialf in Heerenveen, Netherlands, from 9 January until 11 January 2004. Mark Tuitert and  Anni Friesinger won the titles.

Men's championships

Day 1

Day 2

1500 metres

Day 3

10000 metres

Allround results 

NQ = Not qualified for the 10000 m (only the best 16 are qualified)
DNS = Did not start
DQ = Disqualified

Source: ISU

Women's championships

Day 1

Day 2

Day 3

5000 metres

Allround results 

NQ = Not qualified for the 5000 m (only the best 16 are qualified)
DNS = Did not start
DQ = Disqualified
* fall

Source: ISU

Rules 
All participating skaters are allowed to skate the first three distances; 16 skaters may take part on the fourth distance. These 16 skaters are determined by taking the standings on the longest of the first three distances, as well as the samalog standings after three distances, and comparing these lists as follows:

 Skaters among the top 12 on both lists are qualified.
 To make up a total of 16, skaters are then added in order of their best rank on either list. Samalog standings take precedence over the longest-distance standings in the event of a tie.

See also 
 2004 World Allround Speed Skating Championships

References 

European Speed Skating Championships, 2004
2004 European Allround
European Allround, 2004
Sport in Heerenveen
2004 in Dutch sport